Amata choneutospila  is a species of moth of the subfamily Arctiinae first described by Alfred Jefferis Turner in 1905. It is found in Australia.

References 

choneutospila
Moths of Australia